The 1994 All-Western Athletic Conference football team consists of American football players chosen by various selectors for their All-Western Athletic Conference ("WAC") teams for the 1994 NCAA Division I-A football season.

Offensive selections

Quarterbacks
 Stoney Case, New Mexico

Running backs
 Ryan Christopherson, Wyoming
 Jamal Willis, BYU

Wide receivers
 Marcus Harris, Wyoming
 Curtis Marsh, Utah
 Charlie Jones, Fresno State

Tight ends
 David Sloan, Wyoming

Offensive linemen
 Lance Scott, Utah
 Pat Meyer, Colorado State
 Anthony Brown, Utah
 Bret Cillessen, Air Force
 Evan Pilgrim, BYU

Defensive selections

Defensive linemen
 Sean Moran, Colorado State
 Randy Brock, BYU
 Luther Elliss, Utah
 La'Roi Glover, San Diego State

Linebackers
 Johnny Harrison, Air Force
 Kenya Ragsdale, Colorado State
 Mark Rexford, Utah
 Junior Faavae, Hawaii

Defensive backs
 Ricky Parker, San Diego State
 Andre Strode, Colorado State
 Kareem Leary, Utah
 Ernest Boyd, Utah
 Greg Myers, Colorado State

Special teams

Placekickers
 Marshall Young, Texas-El Paso

Punters
 Brian Gragert, Wyoming

Return specialist
 David Dunn, Fresno State

See also
1995 College Football All-America Team

References

All-Western Athletic Conference football team
All-Western Athletic Conference football teams